Marianne North (24 October 1830 – 30 August 1890) was a prolific English Victorian biologist and botanical artist, notable for her plant and landscape paintings, her extensive foreign travels, her writings, her plant discoveries and the creation of her gallery at the Royal Botanic Gardens, Kew.

Early life and education 
North was born in Hastings, England, the eldest daughter of a prosperous land-owning family descended from Roger North, younger son of Dudley North, 4th Baron North. Her father was Frederick North, a Norfolk Deputy Lieutenant and Justice of the Peace, and Liberal M.P. for Hastings. Her mother, Janet, was the daughter of Sir John Marjoribanks M.P., 1st Baronet of Lees in the County of Berwick. She was the eldest of three children.

North trained as a vocalist under Charlotte Helen Sainton-Dolby, but her voice failed, and she then devoted herself to painting flowers. After the death of her mother in 1855, she constantly travelled with her father, who was then member of parliament for Hastings; and on his death in 1869 she decided to pursue her early ambition of painting the flora of distant countries.

Middle life 
She began flower painting after the death of her mother in 1855. The family had homes in Hastings and London in this period. Her interest in botany may have stemmed from her father's acquaintance with Sir Joseph Dalton Hooker, director of Royal Botanic Gardens, Kew. Her first watercolour landscapes were undertaken on a trip to Europe with her sister and father.

Career 

After her sister married in 1864 and her father lost his seat in parliament, the two spent even more time travelling, visiting Switzerland and the South Tyrol. They travelled in Syria and along the Nile in 1865–67. Her father became ill in the Alps in 1869, and she brought him back to Hastings, where he died. She continued to paint as a way to assuage her grief. After her father's death in 1869, she travelled and made paintings in Sicily. In 1871–1872, she travelled to Canada, the United States and Jamaica, and spent a year in Brazil, where she did much of her work at a hut in the depths of a forest. North was encouraged to visit South America by Frederic Edwin Church, whom she considered "the greatest of living landscape painters" and whose home in New York, Olana, she visited twice. In 1875, after a few months in Tenerife, she began a journey round the world, and for two years painted the flora of California, Japan, Borneo, Java and Ceylon. During her visits to California, she recorded her concern with the destruction of the redwoods. She spent all of 1878 in various parts of India.

In 1878 The Graphic reported an exhibition of Marianne North's works at Kensington, in which 512 of her oil paintings were put on public display. In a long article, the critic praised North for "her freedom of hand, the purity and brilliancy of colour and the accurate draughtsmanship of a consummate artist".

On her return to Britain, North exhibited a number of her drawings in London. She offered to give the collection to the Royal Botanic Gardens at Kew, and to erect a gallery to house them. This offer was accepted, and the new buildings, designed by James Fergusson, were begun that year.

At Charles Darwin's suggestion, North went to Australia in 1880, and for a year painted there and in New Zealand. On her return, she presented Darwin the shrub 'Australian Sheep' (Raoulia eximia) as a gift and showed him her Australian pictures. Her paintings of Banksia attenuata, B. grandis and B. robur were highly regarded. Her gallery at Kew was opened in 1882. On display for the opening of the gallery were 800 oil on cardboard paintings, which represented twenty years of North's life and travels.

In 1883, after a visit to South Africa, during which trip she called on the botanical artist Katharine Saunders, an additional room was opened at the Kew gallery, and in 1884–1885 North worked in the Seychelles and in Chile. When ill-health curtailed her travelling she moved to Alderley, Gloucestershire where she died on 30 August 1890 and is buried in the local churchyard.

Legacy
The scientific accuracy with which she documented plant life in all parts of the world, before photography became a practical option, gives her work a permanent value. Plant species named in her honour include Areca northiana, Chassalia northiana, Crinum northianum, Kniphofia northiae, Nepenthes northiana, and the genus name Northia.

Kew Gardens claims that the North Gallery (situated in the east section of the gardens) is "the only permanent solo exhibition by a female artist in Britain". In 2008 Kew obtained a substantial grant from the National Lottery, which enabled it to mount a major restoration of both the gallery and the paintings inside.

On 26 September 2016, the television channel BBC Four broadcast Kew's forgotten queen. The documentary told the story of North's life.

Gallery

Footnotes

Bibliography

Further reading

External links

 
 Information about the Marianne North Gallery at the Royal Botanic Gardens at Kew
 The Online gallery of paintings in the Marianne North Gallery, Kew Gardens
 1043 artworks by Marianne North at Art UK

1830 births
1890 deaths
19th-century British painters
19th-century British women artists
Burials in Gloucestershire
English naturalists
English women painters
Flower artists
People from Alderley, Gloucestershire
People from Hastings
Royal Botanic Gardens, Kew
Scientific illustrators
Women of the Victorian era
Marianne